Studia philosophica is a peer-reviewed academic journal that discusses themes and topics related to philosophy. The journal was established in 2009. It is published by the department of philosophy of Masaryk University two times a year and distributed all over the country. The editor-in-chief is Jan Zouhar.

See also 
 List of philosophy journals

References

External links 
 

Czech-language journals
English-language journals
Philosophy journals
Czech philosophy
Biannual journals
Publications established in 2009